There are two rivers in Brazil named Gregório River:

 Gregório River (Amazonas)
 Gregório River (Goiás)